Hendrik Beltsazer Hart (2 September 1905 – 10 November 1979) was a South African athlete who competed in the 1932 Summer Olympics.

He was born in Harrismith, Orange River Colony, and died in Reitz.

In 1932 he finished tenth in the Olympic shot put event, eleventh in the decathlon competition, and twelfth in the discus throw contest.

At the 1930 Empire Games he won the gold medal in the discus throw event as well as in the shot put competition. He also won the bronze medal in the javelin throw contest and finished fifth in the 120 yards hurdles event. In the 440 yards hurdles competition he was eliminated in the heats.

Four years later at the 1934 Empire Games he won again the gold medal in the discus throw event as well as in the shot put competition. In the javelin throw contest he won the silver medal.

Hart was the owner of the Royal Hotel in Reitz, Free State, South Africa. He was friends with Douglas Fairbanks, Errol Flynn, Clark Gable, Johnny Weissmuller and Blackie Swarts (at that time a cowboy actor and later the first president of South Africa). He was offered the part of Tarzan but refused as he had to return home to his farm to practice for the Empire Games. He had a study-trophy room at his hotel where there were hundreds of photographs of himself in the company of the above-mentioned and Esther Williams, Maureen O'Sullivan and others.

References

External links
 

1905 births
1979 deaths
People from Harrismith
South African male discus throwers
South African male shot putters
South African male javelin throwers
South African male hurdlers
South African decathletes
Olympic athletes of South Africa
Athletes (track and field) at the 1932 Summer Olympics
Athletes (track and field) at the 1930 British Empire Games
Athletes (track and field) at the 1934 British Empire Games
Commonwealth Games gold medallists for South Africa
Commonwealth Games silver medallists for South Africa
Commonwealth Games bronze medallists for South Africa
Commonwealth Games medallists in athletics
20th-century South African people
Medallists at the 1930 British Empire Games
Medallists at the 1934 British Empire Games